CGS Minto was one of the Government of Canada's first icebreakers. She was modeled after , Canada's first effective icebreaker, but was slightly longer and more powerful. Like her predecessor, her primary winter duties were keeping Prince Edward Island connected to the mainland—one of the conditions under which the province had entered Confederation. The ship entered service in 1899 and remained on the East Coast of Canada until 1915, when Minto was sold to the Russian Empire. Transferred in November, she became Ivan Susanin, and was tasked with keeping northern ports open during the war. Her name was changed to Leitenant Dreyer in 1920 after being taken over the Soviet Navy and Skuratov in 1921. The ship was wrecked in the Barents Sea in 1922.

Description
Mintos design was based on CGS Stanley, Canada's previously constructed icebreaker. Minto was larger and had no bowsprit and a rounded bow. Minto was intended to augment Stanley in servicing Prince Edward Island.

The ship was powered by steam from a triple-expansion engine driving a single screw.

Service history
The ship was ordered from Gourlay Brothers and constructed in Dundee, Scotland. The vessel was launched on 12 July 1899, named for the Governor General of Canada, Gilbert Elliot-Murray-Kynynmound, 4th Earl of Minto. The vessel was completed in September 1899.

Like Stanley, Minto was used as a lighthouse and buoy supply vessel from spring to fall and in winter, was used for icebreaking and passenger ferry service to and from Prince Edward Island. In 1905, the ice became too thick for either ship to traverse and the ferry service was suspended, with travel to island done by iceboat. In 1911, 1912 and 1915, Minto was sent to Hudson Bay for survey work. 

During the First World War, the Russian Empire required icebreakers to keep northern ports open for cargo traffic. In 1915 Canada sold the vessel to Imperial Russia, with Minto departing in November for Archangelsk. Upon arrival, the ship was renamed Ivan Susanin and was deployed in the White Sea, breaking Russian and British ships out of the ice. In 1920, with the fall of the Russian Empire, the ship was taken over by the Soviet Navy and renamed Leitenant Dreyer. In 1921 the vessel was renamed again, this time to Skuratov. In 1922 Skuratov foundered at Cheshskaya Guba in the east Barents Sea.

References

Citations

Sources

External links

Auxiliary ships of the Royal Canadian Navy
Icebreakers of the Royal Canadian Navy
Canadian Government Ship